The Argentina–Netherlands football rivalry is a highly competitive sports rivalry that exists between the national football teams of the two countries, as well as their respective sets of fans.

Unlike many football rivalries, this one is intercontinental, pairing the Argentinian team from South America with the Dutch team from Europe.

First meeting in an international friendly in May 1974, the two teams met just one month later in the group stage of the 1974 FIFA World Cup. Since then, the matchup has become one of the most common in the World Cup, with the two teams meeting a total of six times during the tournament.

In total, the Netherlands have won four games to Argentina's one, with the other five other matches ending in a draw. Including 3 victories for Argentina on penalty shootout.

History
Considered by sports media to be two historically great teams, the Argentines and Dutch have developed an intense rivalry. They have met ten times in total, and six times during the FIFA World Cup tournament.

First matches
The two teams first met on 26 May 1974 in an international friendly, won by the Netherlands 4–1. The following month, the two teams were drawn into Group A of the second round of the 1974 FIFA World Cup held in West Germany. Their first FIFA World Cup matchup took place on 26 June; Johan Cruyff scored two goals in a victory for the Netherlands, which saw the Dutch defeat Argentina 4–0.

1978 FIFA World Cup final and 1979 friendly

The two teams met again in the 1978 FIFA World Cup final, with Argentina avenging their 1974 loss, defeating the Netherlands 3–1. Argentina hosted the 1978 tournament which was marred by controversy, with political pressure allegedly favoring Argentina on the pitch. Held under the backdrop of Jorge Rafael Videla's dictatorship, the tournament was seen as a tool for Argentine nationalist propaganda. The Peruvian national team were allegedly bribed to throw their match against Argentina, which sent the latter to the final over Brazil. In the final, Mario Kempes and Dick Nanninga scored during regulation, for Argentina and the Netherlands, respectively. Tied at 1–1, the match went into extra time. Kempes scored again and Daniel Bertoni added another goal for the Argentines, securing them a 3–1 victory.

The two teams met again the following year for a friendly game organized by FIFA to celebrate the organization's 75th anniversary. The game was documented by Sports Illustrated writer Clive Gammon to be hotly contested, ending in a 0–0 draw; FIFA opted to stage a penalty shootout, which ended 8–7 in Argentina's favor. The game was also notable for featuring an 18-year-old Diego Maradona, who joined Argentina's roster due to a leg injury to Kempes.

1998 FIFA World Cup match and subsequent friendlies
After not meeting during the 1980s, the two teams met during the quarter-finals of the 1998 FIFA World Cup. The Netherlands' Patrick Kluivert and Argentina's Claudio López traded goals early in the match. Tied at 1–1, Dennis Bergkamp scored a late goal in the game's 90th-minute to give the Dutch a 2–1 victory. Bergkamp's goal would become regarded as one of the more iconic goals in FIFA World Cup history.

The two teams met for a friendly in March 1999, which ended in a 1–1 draw. Another friendly between the two sides took place in February 2003; it saw Giovanni van Bronckhorst score a late goal in the 87th minute to give the Dutch a 1–0 victory.

Scoreless draws in the 2006 and 2014 FIFA World Cups
The two teams played in three consecutive draws in FIFA World Cup matches in 2006, 2014, and 2022. The 2006 match occurred during the tournament's group stage, as the Dutch and the Argentines were both drawn into Group C. The final group stage game for both squads, they entered the game having both already secured a trip to the tournament's knockout stage. The match was a scoreless affair. Argentina finished ahead of the Netherlands in the group, due to winning the tie-breaker based on goal differential.

Argentina and the Netherlands met again in the semi-finals of the 2014 FIFA World Cup. Described as "tedious" by BBC writer Phil McNulty, the game provided little offense, as both defenses remained in control throughout the 0–0 draw. Deadlocked after extra time, Argentina prevailed 4–2 on penalties. They converted all four of their penalty attempts, while the Dutch's Ron Vlaar and Wesley Sneijder had their attempts saved by Argentine goalkeeper Sergio Romero.

2022 FIFA World Cup quarter-finals
Another FIFA World Cup matchup between the two teams occurred in the 2022 tournament's quarter-finals. The game was noted for its contentious nature prior to, during, and after the match. Prior to the match, Dutch manager Louis van Gaal stated "we've got a score to settle with Argentina for what happened two World Cups ago". The match saw Argentina take a 2–0 lead after Lionel Messi assisted Nahuel Molina on a goal in the first half, before scoring on a penalty goal in the second. Wout Weghorst, a late-game substitution for the Netherlands scored 2 goals, including one in the eleventh and final minute of stoppage time to help the Dutch even the game at 2–2. Between Weghorst's two goals, both benches cleared and players from both teams engaged in a scuffle due to a harsh foul from Leandro Paredes and the ball being kicked toward the Dutch sideline. The game remained tied after extra time, sending the two teams to a penalty shootout. Argentina prevailed 4–3, with both teams attempting five shots. Argentine goalkeeper Emiliano Martinez made two saves and was notably animated during the shootout. Lautaro Martínez converted on Argentina's fifth attempt to send them to the semi-finals en route to their third FIFA World Cup victory. 

The game was noted by many football writers to be dramatic and hotly contested. Argentina was seen gloating at the Netherlands side immediately after the match, but Argentinan defender Nicolás Otamendi explained that this was in response to several Dutch players trying intimidation tactics during the penalty shootout. A record 17 yellow cards were handed out to players and coaching staff during the game; Antonio Mateu, the game's referee attracted controversy for his officiating. Reporting on the game, Jason Burt of The Telegraph wrote, "it was feisty, downright dirty and with huge amounts of gamesmanship. Even the post-match interviews were aggressive with Messi snapping at the Dutch camp as he talked." Messi said after the match that he felt disrespected by Van Gaal's pregame comments and stated, "some Dutch players spoke too much during the game". However, Messi later expressed regret for his actions during and after the match, calling them a result of several moments of tension between the two sides.

This match between Argentina and the Netherlands at the 2022 tournament referred as The battle of Lusail according to reports and fans.

List of matches

See also
 Argentina–Netherlands relations

Notes

References

Sources

Argentina at the 1974 FIFA World Cup
Argentina at the 1978 FIFA World Cup
Argentina at the 1998 FIFA World Cup
Argentina at the 2006 FIFA World Cup
Argentina at the 2014 FIFA World Cup
Argentina at the 2022 FIFA World Cup
Netherlands
Argentina–Netherlands relations
History of the Netherlands national football team
International association football rivalries
Netherlands at the 1974 FIFA World Cup
Netherlands at the 1978 FIFA World Cup
Netherlands at the 1998 FIFA World Cup
Netherlands at the 2006 FIFA World Cup
Netherlands at the 2014 FIFA World Cup
Netherlands at the 2022 FIFA World Cup